Macrostomorpha is a clade of free living flatworms ranked either as class or subclass in the group Rhabditophora. There are about 260 described species in two orders - marine, freshwater and brackish Macrostomida, which group most of the species diversity, and exclusively marine Haplopharyngida with only three described species. Macrostomorpha constitute a basal group in Rhabditophora, showing such plesiomorphic condition as entolecithal eggs and spiral cleavage. Another trait found among members of the clade is presence of hard stylet in the male copulatory organ.

References 

Turbellaria
Rhabditophora